Guyandotte is a historic neighborhood in the city of Huntington, West Virginia, that previously existed as a separate town before annexation was completed by the latter. The neighborhood is home to many historic properties, and was first settled by natives of France at the end of the eighteenth century.  Guyandotte was already a thriving town when the state of West Virginia was formed from part of Virginia.  Located at the confluence of the Guyandotte River and the Ohio River, it was already a regional trade center with several industries of its own when the Chesapeake and Ohio Railway (C&O) reached its western terminus nearby just across the Guyandotte River in 1873. This event was soon followed by the formation and quick development of the present city of Huntington which was named in honor of the C&O Railway's founder and then principal owner Collis P. Huntington.

History

First settled in 1799, Guyandotte was established on a tract of land belonging to the Savage Grant, a  parcel of land in western Virginia granted to veterans of the French and Indian War. These veterans served under Captain John Savage.  The original grant extended from the present site of Milton, West Virginia in the east, to the Kentucky side of the Big Sandy River, then part of Virginia, in the west.  Nearly all of present-day Huntington is situated on land that was part of the Savage Grant.       

Before it was annexed by Huntington, Guyandotte was an old Federal Era town and has homes dating back to 1820.  A graveyard containing 18th-century French and Colonial-era settlers with surnames such as LeTulle, Holderby, and Buffington, continues to exist in the neighborhood. Huntington was known as Holderby's Landing prior to 1871, and members of the Buffington family held tracts of land that later became the Huntington Land Company. The Buffingtons were the only revolutionary-era Savage Grant claimants to continuously reside within the area, and later generations of Buffingtons were associated with Marshall College (now  Marshall University) and were business partners of Collis P. Huntington. The Confederate Army general Albert Gallatin Jenkins' plantation home, Green Bottom, is located in nearby Lesage. Green Bottom was listed on the National Register of Historic Places in 1978.    

At the time of Huntington's founding, Holderby's Landing was already the home of Marshall College, a normal school that had been founded in 1837 as Marshall Academy. Originally, Marshall Academy was essentially a boarding school, under control by the Southern Methodist Episcopal Church, and intended to serve high school students from wealthy families. In 1857, the school became Marshall College, which in turn became a public institution in 1867. The college later became Marshall University in 1961 and now occupies a large portion of the city to the immediate east of the downtown CBD.

Historic buildings at Guyandotte include the Madie Carroll House and the Zachary Taylor Wellington House, both listed on the National Register of Historic Places.

References

External links
 http://www.wvculture.org/history/thisdayinwvhistory/0105.html

Pre-statehood history of West Virginia
Huntington, West Virginia